is a Japanese television announcer and works for Yomiuri Telecasting Corporation. After leaving Yomiuri TV, he will run a personal company "Mori chan".

He entered Yomiuri TV as a television announcer in 1983, and won the 1987 Silver Award from the Shingo-Ryūkōgo Taishō (lit. "Neologism-Buzzword Prize") with Jiro Shinbo for creating the buzzword neologism  in response to the losing streak of the Hanshin Tigers during that time period.

References

1959 births
Living people
People from Shinagawa
Japanese television personalities